South Fallsburg is a hamlet and census-designated place in Sullivan County, New York, United States. South Fallsburg is located within the Town of Fallsburg at  (41.716489, -74.630279).

History 
South Fallsburg is located in the one-time resort area of the Catskill Mountains known as the Borscht Belt. The Rivoli Theatre and South Fallsburg Hebrew Association Synagogue are listed on the National Register of Historic Places. The town is home to a center of Siddha Yoga, the Shree Muktananda Ashram of the SYDA Foundation.

Demographics

As of the 2010 United States Census, there were 2,870 people, 909 households, and 606 families residing in South Fallsburg. There were 1,385 housing units. The racial makeup of the CDP included 63.7% White and 14.2% African American. Hispanic or Latino of any race were 38.5% of the population. Families including a husband and a wife made up 38.8% of the population. As of 2017, an estimated 59.2% of residents were below the poverty level.

Notable people

South Fallsburg is home to singer-songwriters Gavin and Joey DeGraw, librarian Sari Feldman, jazz pianist and composer Kenny Werner, and Yeshiva Gedolah Zichron Moshe.

References

Further reading
 Manville B. Wakefield, To The Mountains By Rail

External links
The 1970 Hippie invasion of South Fallsburg

Census-designated places in New York (state)
Hamlets in New York (state)
Fallsburg, New York
Census-designated places in Sullivan County, New York
Hamlets in Sullivan County, New York